The London Short Film Festival, founded in 2004, is a film festival held annually at various locations in London, in January. The festival celebrates short film production. Each year the festival appoints an international jury who award prizes worth over £20,000.

History
The London Short Film Festival was started in 2002.  It is a BAFTA affiliated festival, enabling accepted UK filmmakers to apply for the 2020 BAFTA awards.

In 2020, the festival takes place from 10–19 January.

Awards Categories
Awards categories include:
 Best International Short Film
 Best Documentary Short Film
 Best Animated Short Film
 Random Acts Award
 Best Lo-Budget Short Film

Rules
Submission takes place via FilmFreeway. Submissions are open to short films in every genre, including drama, comedy, horror, science fiction, documentary, experimental, animation, music, and low-budget films.

See also
 BFI London Film Festival
 London Film Week 
 London Independent Film Festival
 London International Animation Festival
 London International Student Film Festival
 UK Film Festival

References

External links

Film festivals in London
Short film festivals in the United Kingdom